Ignatius IV may refer to:

Ignatius IV Sarrouf (1742–1812)
Ignatius IV of Antioch (1920–2012)